Kleis Site is an historic archeological site located at Hamburg in Erie County, New York. The site contains the remnants of a 17th-century Iroquoian village and burial ground, and is one of a small number of Native American villages on the Niagara Frontier.

It was listed on the National Register of Historic Places in 1979.

References

Iroquois populated places
Archaeological sites on the National Register of Historic Places in New York (state)
Geography of Erie County, New York
National Register of Historic Places in Erie County, New York